Post-coital tristesse (PCT), also known as post-coital dysphoria (PCD), and colloquially post-nut clarity, is the feeling of sadness, anxiety, agitation or aggression, after sexual intercourse or masturbation. Its name comes from New Latin postcoitalis and French tristesse, literally "sadness". Many people with PCT may exhibit strong feelings of anxiety lasting from five minutes to two hours after coitus.

The phenomenon is attributed to the Greek medical writer Galen, who is supposed to have written that "Every animal is sad after coitus except the human female and the rooster." However, this quotation is not found in Galen's surviving writings, so it may be a later fabrication. Sigmund Freud and Havelock Ellis were familiar with the proverb, which they both attributed to an anonymous author, and it was not until decades later that the maxim became connected with Galen among sexologists.

The philosopher Baruch Spinoza, in his Tractatus de Intellectus Emendatione, wrote: "For as far as sensual pleasure is concerned, the mind is so caught up in it, as if at peace in a [true] good, that it is quite prevented from thinking of anything else. But after the enjoyment of sensual pleasure is passed, the greatest sadness follows. If this does not completely engross, still it thoroughly confuses and dulls the mind." Arthur Schopenhauer, writing later on the phenomenon, observed that "directly after copulation the devil's laughter is heard."

One study reported that among a sample of 1208 male participants, 40% of them had experienced PCT at least once in their lifetime and 20% reported experiencing PCT in the four weeks preceding the study. This study also reports that 3–4% of the sample experienced PCT symptoms on a regular basis. According to the same study, PCT among males is associated with current psychological distress, sexual abuse during childhood, and with several sexual dysfunctions.

With respect to symptoms in women, one study involved an epidemiological survey of post-coital psychological symptoms in a United Kingdom population sample of female twins: it found that 3.7% of these women reported suffering from recent PCT and 7.7% of them reported suffering PCT for a long time. Another study reported that almost half of female university students reported PCT symptoms at least once in their lifetime. The study also reported that there appeared to be no correlation between PCT and intimacy in close relationships.

See also
 Prolactin
 La petite mort
 Post Coïtum, Animal Triste, 1997 film

References

External links 

Sexual health
Orgasm
French medical phrases